Live 1967 may refer to:

 Live 1967 (The Monkees album)
 Live 1967 (Red Krayola album)